Emmanouil (Manolis) Rasoulis (28 September 19455 March 2011), best known as the lyricist of famous songs, was a Greek music composer, singer, writer, and journalist.

Rasoulis was born in 1945 in Heraklion, Crete. He frequently collaborated with famous musicians such as Manos Loizos, Stavros Kougioumtzis, Nikos Xydakis, and Christos Nikolopoulos, and singers such as Vasilis Papakonstantinou, Haris Alexiou, Sokratis Malamas, and Nikos Papazoglou.

He was found dead in his apartment in the Toumba area of Thessaloniki on 13 March 2011 at the age of 65. His death is estimated to have occurred more than a week earlier, on 5 March, from a suspected heart attack.

References

External links
 Manolis Rasoulis official site

1945 births
2011 deaths
Greek journalists
Greek lyricists
Greek songwriters
20th-century Greek male singers
Musicians from Heraklion